Denman Peak is a small 6,006 ft summit in the Tatoosh Range which is a sub-range of the Cascade Range. It's located south of Mount Rainier within Mount Rainier National Park. Denman Peak is situated east of Lane Peak and west of Pinnacle Peak.

Formerly known as That Peak, in 1931 The Mountaineers named it for their lawyer, Asahel Holmes Denman of Tacoma, following twenty years of work in the interests of the organization.

Precipitation runoff on the south side of the peak drains into tributaries of the Cowlitz River, whereas the north side drains into tributaries of the Nisqually River.

Climate

Denman Peak is located in the marine west coast climate zone of western North America. Most weather fronts originate in the Pacific Ocean, and travel northeast toward the Cascade Mountains. As fronts approach, they are forced upward by the peaks of the Cascade Range (Orographic lift), causing them to drop their moisture in the form of rain or snowfall onto the Cascades. As a result, the west side of the North Cascades experiences high precipitation, especially during the winter months in the form of snowfall. During winter months, weather is usually cloudy, but, due to high pressure systems over the Pacific Ocean that intensify during summer months, there is often little or no cloud cover during the summer. Because of maritime influence, snow tends to be wet and heavy, resulting in avalanche danger.

Climbing

The Pinnacle Saddle Trailhead is located on the south side of the Stevens Canyon Road at Reflection Lakes. The well maintained Pinnacle Saddle Trail climbs 1,050 feet to the saddle in 1.25 mile length. From the saddle between Pinnacle and Plummer Peak, a climber's path traverses the north slope of Plummer Peak. Reaching the summit of Denman Peak is short class 2-3 scrambling.

References

External links
 Weather forecast: Denman Peak
 National Park Service web site: Mount Rainier National Park

Cascade Range
Mountains of Lewis County, Washington
Mountains of Washington (state)